BMO Plaza, formerly the M&I Plaza, is a high-rise office building located at 135 North Pennsylvania Street in Indianapolis, Indiana. It is primarily used for office space. At , BMO Plaza is the ninth-largest office building downtown, according to IBJ statistics. Tenants include BMO Harris Bank, U.S. Department of Defense, and General Electric Capital Services.

History
The building was developed as First Indiana Plaza by Indianapolis-based Phillip R. Duke and Associates and construction was started in mid 1986 following the demolition of the seven-story Denison Parking garage on the site. When the building opened in April 1988, it served as the headquarters of the First Indiana Federal Savings Bank, the building's major tenant.

In September 2008, the building was renamed M&I Plaza following the acquisition of First Indiana by Marshall & Ilsley Corporation earlier that year. Three years later, the building changed name a second time to BMO Plaza.

During the late nineteenth century, the building site had been the home of the Denison Hotel.

See also
List of tallest buildings in Indianapolis
List of tallest buildings in Indiana

References

External links

BMO Plaza at Skyscraper Page
BMO Plaza at Emporis

Skyscraper office buildings in Indianapolis

Office buildings completed in 1989
1989 establishments in Indiana